"Dorado" is a song by Italian singer Mahmood, Italian rapper Sfera Ebbasta and Colombian singer-songwriter Feid. It was released on 9 July 2020 by Island Records. The song peaked at number 10 on the Italian Singles Chart. The song was written by Davide Petrella, Alessandro Mahmoud, Gionata Boschetti, Christian Senra Bértolo, Feid and DRD.

Music video
A music video to accompany the release of "Dorado" was first released onto YouTube on 16 July 2020. The music video was directed by Attilio Cusani and shot inside the Egyptian Museum in Turin.

Personnel
Credits adapted from Tidal.
 DRD– producer, composer
 Feid – associated performer, author, vocals
 Alessandro Mahmoud – associated performer, author, vocals
 Sfera Ebbasta – associated performer, vocals
 Christian Senra Bértolo – author
 Davide Petrella – author
 Gionata Boschetti – author

Charts

Certifications

References

2020 singles
2020 songs
Island Records singles
Mahmood (singer) songs
Sfera Ebbasta songs
Songs written by Mahmood
Songs written by Davide Petrella